This is a list of tennis players who have represented the Belarus Davis Cup team in an official Davis Cup match. Belarus have taken part in the competition since 1994. Previously, Belarusians were members of the Soviet Union Davis Cup team. Belarus was suspended in 2022, due to the 2022 Russian invasion of Ukraine.

Players

References

Davis Cup
Lists of Davis Cup tennis players